António Bernardo da Costa Cabral, 1st Count and 1st Marquis of Tomar (9 May 1803 – 1 September 1889) was a Portuguese 19th century statesman.

Early life
Born in Fornos de Algodres he trained as a lawyer in Coimbra and was later appointed as a judge. A liberal, he earned a mixed reputation of fear and admiration.

Career
He was appointed Governor of Lisbon in 1836 and was a confidant of Queen Maria II of Portugal. The year he was appointed, he used force to put down radical mobs in Lisbon (the Rossio massacre). He restored diplomatic relations with the Vatican and re-introduced a conservative Constitutional Charter. Following an 1842 coup d'état, he was appointed as Minister and Secretary for Royal State Affairs (the equivalent of a today's interior minister) in 1843. In 1846 famine led to the peasant revolt of Maria da Fonte in the north of Portugal, and he was removed from office. He fled to England but was restored to power in 1848. Again due to his unpopularity and the now poor economic state of Portugal he was replaced for a second time by the Duque de Saldanha in 1851.

See also
List of Portuguese Prime Ministers
Marquis of Tomar
Count of Tomar

References
Portugal History via Library of Congress

1803 births
1889 deaths
People from Fornos de Algodres
Portuguese nobility
Prime Ministers of Portugal
Ambassadors of Portugal to Brazil
Ambassadors of Portugal to the Holy See
People of the Liberal Wars
19th-century Portuguese people
University of Coimbra alumni
Commanders of the Order of the Immaculate Conception of Vila Viçosa
Knights Grand Cross of the Order of the Immaculate Conception of Vila Viçosa